The Men's Javelin Throw event at the 1968 Summer Olympics took place on October 15–16 at the Estadio Olímpico Universitario.

Records
Prior to this competition, the existing world and Olympic records were as follows:

Results

Qualifying round

Finals
The eight highest-ranked competitors after three rounds qualified for the final three throws to decide the medals.

References

M
Javelin throw at the Olympics
Men's events at the 1968 Summer Olympics